Fabian Geiser (born 4 April 1983) is a retired footballer from Switzerland.

External links
FC Schaffhausen profile

References

1983 births
Living people
Swiss men's footballers
FC Schaffhausen players
FC Lausanne-Sport players
BSC Young Boys players
People from Langenthal
Association football defenders
Sportspeople from the canton of Bern